Ombrocharis is a genus of flowering plant in the tribe Elsholtzieae of the family Lamiaceae, first described in 1936. It contains only one known species, Ombrocharis dulcis, endemic to Hunan Province in China.

References

Lamiaceae
Flora of Hunan
Endemic flora of China
Monotypic Lamiaceae genera
Taxa named by Heinrich von Handel-Mazzetti